Jelše may refer to several settlements in Slovenia: 

Jelša, Šmartno pri Litiji, a settlement in the Municipality of Šmartno pri Litiji (known as Jelše until 1990)
Jelše, Krško, a settlement in the Municipality of Krško
Jelše, Mirna Peč, a settlement in the Municipality of Mirna Peč
Jelše pri Otočcu, a settlement in the Municipality of Novo Mesto